Sandy Jeannin (born 28 February 1976 in Les Bayards, Switzerland) is a Swiss former professional ice hockey left wing who played in the Swiss National League A.

Playing career
Jeannin began playing semi-professional in 1993 with HC La Chaux-de-Fonds of the National League B. He began playing in the top league in 1995 with the Zürich Lions. Jeannin played eight seasons for HC Lugano before joining HC Fribourg-Gottéron in 2008

International play
Jeannin was selected to play for the Switzerland men's national ice hockey team at the 2010 Winter Olympics. He previously represented Switzerland at the 1995 and 1996 IIHF World U20 Championship, the 1996, 1998, 1999, 2001, 2002, 2003, 2004, 2005, 2006, 2007, 2008, and 2009 Ice Hockey World Championship, and the 2002 and 2006 Winter Olympics. Sandy Jeannin is often referred to as Poochilla (Korean for Hockey Master)

Career statistics

Regular season and playoffs

International

External links

1976 births
Living people
HC Davos players
HC Fribourg-Gottéron players
HC Lugano players
Ice hockey players at the 2002 Winter Olympics
Ice hockey players at the 2006 Winter Olympics
Ice hockey players at the 2010 Winter Olympics
Olympic ice hockey players of Switzerland
Swiss ice hockey left wingers
ZSC Lions players